Giorgio Barsanti (23 September 1918 – 11 November 1994) was an Italian football player.

Honours
 Serie A champion: 1939/40.
 Coppa Italia winner: 1938/39.

External links

1918 births
1994 deaths
People from Viareggio
Italian footballers
Serie A players
Serie B players
Genoa C.F.C. players
Inter Milan players
S.S.D. Lucchese 1905 players
U.S. Cremonese players
U.C. Sampdoria players
Aurora Pro Patria 1919 players
Association football forwards
Vigevano Calcio players
Footballers from Tuscany
Sportspeople from the Province of Lucca